Orange chicken or chen pi ji is an American Chinese dish.

Origin 
The variety of orange chicken most commonly found at North American Chinese restaurants consists of chopped, battered and fried chicken pieces coated in a sweet orange-flavored chili sauce, which thickens or caramelizes to a glaze. While the dish is very popular in the United States, it is most often found as a variation of General Tso's chicken in North America rather than the dish found in mainland China. Chef Andy Kao claims to have developed the original Chinese-American orange chicken recipe at a Panda Express in Hawaii in 1987. Since Panda Express is closely associated with this dish, Panda Express uses orange chicken as a promotion tool by having a dedicated food truck tour the country distributing samples of orange chicken.

Orange chicken is called Chinese food in North America, but orange chicken is rarely found in Chinese restaurants in China. Andrew Cherng, owner and founder of Panda Express, said that orange chicken is just a variation of General Tso's chicken, another dish that is almost unknown in China. Journalist Jennifer 8. Lee says that both "General Tso's chicken and Orange Chicken are Americanized mutations of sweet and sour dishes found in China." Orange chicken has also entered the menus of the mainstream U.S. by being served in school cafeterias, and in military bases' chow halls, and also found in the supermarket frozen meal aisle.

Jimmy Wang, executive director of culinary innovation at Panda Express, claims orange chicken is one of the most creative dishes in the past thirty years. In most countries in the western hemisphere, the names "orange chicken", "orange peel chicken", "orange-flavored chicken", and "tangerine chicken" are typically used for this particular dish. 

This dish may have originally come from the "tangerine chicken" dish from Hunan province, China. In Chinese, this dish is known as "陳皮雞", literally "dried citrus peel chicken", referring to dried orange or tangerine peel. However, the taste and recipes of this dish differ due to cultural and geographical factors. In American Chinese restaurants, the use of tangerine was changed to the use of fresh orange peel or no orange at all. Tangerine is used in traditional Chinese medicine as well as cooking. Tangerine chicken tastes fresh and spicy, but orange chicken tastes sweet and sour. Orange chicken is crispy cooked in a sweet and little spicy orange sauce. The sweetness of orange chicken was introduced to cater to American tastes.

Popularity 
Orange chicken is the signature dish of the American fast food chain Panda Express, which sells over 100 million pounds of it every year. In the TV series The Big Bang Theory, the character Sheldon's favorite Chinese food is orange chicken.

See also
Similar Chinese chicken dishes:
 Crispy fried chicken
 General Tso's chicken
 Kung Pao chicken
 Lemon chicken
 List of chicken dishes
 Pineapple chicken
 Sesame chicken
 Sweet and sour chicken
 White cut chicken

References

External links
 

American Chinese chicken dishes
Deep fried foods
Citrus dishes
Culture in Hunan